Wenona is an unincorporated community and census-designated place (CDP) in Crisp County, Georgia, United States. Interstate 75 forms the eastern border of the CDP, with access from Exit 97.

It was first listed as a CDP in the 2020 census with a population of 231.

Demographics

2020 census

Note: the US Census treats Hispanic/Latino as an ethnic category. This table excludes Latinos from the racial categories and assigns them to a separate category. Hispanics/Latinos can be of any race.

References 

Census-designated places in Crisp County, Georgia
Census-designated places in Georgia (U.S. state)